Basketball Nightmare is a 1989 basketball sports video game that was released exclusively for the Sega Master System in Europe, Canada and Brazil.

Gameplay

The player is the captain of the hometown basketball team. Before he could prepare his team to win the all-American tournament, he started to have strange dreams about playing basketball in exotic locations against exotic creatures.

The first level is against werewolves in the forest. Then, the gameplay involves into a game against the vampires inside a cave of skeletons before progressing into games against geisha and even against a troop of samurai warriors. Each opposing player is represented in a super-deformed anime style. Players can replay the matches that they lost until they finally beat the opposing team. Players must choose between a 15-minute game, a 30-minute game, or a 45-minute game. Several basketball fouls can be called; including traveling, charging (the player with the ball intentionally collides with a defender), and pushing (the defending player intentionally colliding with the ball handler).

There is an alternate mode that allows players to play "international basketball" against countries like the US, Japan, Cuba, China, the German Democratic Republic, the Soviet Union, Canada, and France.

Reception
Zero magazine gave it an 88% score. Console XS also gave it an 88% score.

References

External links

1989 video games
Basketball video games
Master System games
Master System-only games
Multiplayer and single-player video games
Video games developed in Japan